Second Lake (Nova Scotia) could mean the following

Annapolis County
Second Lake at 
Second Lake at

Argyle
Second Lake at 
Second Lake at 
Second Lake at

Cape Breton Regional Municipality
Second Lake at

Municipality of Clare
Second Lake at

Municipality of the District of Chester
Second Lake at

Municipality of the District of Guysborough
Second Lake at 
Second Lake at 
Second Lake at

Halifax Regional Municipality
Second Lake at 
Second Lake at 
Second Lake at 
Second Lake at 
Second Lake at 
Second Lake at 
Second Lake at 
Second Lake at 
Second Lake at

Inverness County
Second Lake O'Law at

Region of Queens Municipality
Second Lake at 
Second Lake at

Richmond County
Second Lake at 
Second Lake at

Municipality of the District of Staint Mary's
Second Lake at 
Second Lake at 
Second Lake at 
Second Lake at

Municipality of the District of Yarmouth
Second Lake at

Rivers
Second Lake Brook in the Halifax Regional Municipality at

References
Geographical Names Board of Canada
Explore HRM
Nova Scotia Placenames

Lakes of Nova Scotia
Lakes, Second Lake